Mashhad ol Kubeh (also Romanized as Mashhad ol Kūbeh, Mashhad al Kūbeh and Mashhad Alkoobeh; also known as Mashal Kūbe, Mashhad al Gūbeh, Mashhad-e Elkūbeh and Mashhadelkūbeh) is a village in Mashhad-e Miqan Rural District, Central District, Arak County, Markazi Province, Iran. At the 2006 census, its population was 1,658, in 435 families.

References 

Populated places in Arak County